Results of the 2005 general election.

Scotland

Highlands and Islands

North East Scotland

Mid Scotland and Fife

Central Scotland

West of Scotland

Lothian

South of Scotland

Northern Ireland

Wales

North West England

The Lakes, Lancashire, & Cheshire

Greater Manchester

Merseyside

North East England

Tyne & Wear

Northumberland, Durham & Cleveland

Yorkshire and the Humber

North Yorkshire, East Riding & North/North East Lincolnshire

West Yorkshire

South Yorkshire

East Midlands

Derbyshire, Western Leicestershire & Nottinghamshire

Lincolnshire, Northamptonshire, Rutland, Eastern Leicestershire

West Midlands

Mercia

Birmingham & Coventry

Anglia

Mid-Anglia

East Anglia

South West England

Devon & Cornwall

West England

South East England

Wessex

Channel Coast

London

North East London

North West London

South West London

South East London

Seats that changed hands
A total of 63 seats changed hands, since the 2001 general election.

Labour gains
 from Liberal Democrats
 Leicester South (lost in a by-election, regained)

Conservative gains
 from Labour
 Bexleyheath and Crayford
 Braintree
 Clwyd West
 Croydon Central
 Dumfriesshire, Clydesdale, and Tweeddale Ø
 Enfield Southgate
 Forest of Dean
 Gravesham
 Hammersmith and Fulham
 Harwich
 Hemel Hempstead
 Hornchurch
 Ilford North
 Kettering
 Lancaster and Wyre
 Monmouth
 Milton Keynes North East
 Northampton South
 Peterborough
 Preseli Pembrokeshire
 Putney
 Reading East
 Rugby and Kenilworth
 Scarborough and Whitby
 Shipley
 Shrewsbury and Atcham
 St Albans
 The Wrekin
 Wellingborough
 Welwyn Hatfield
 Wimbledon

 from the Liberal Democrats
 Devon West and Torridge
 Guildford
 Ludlow
 Newbury
 Weston-super-Mare

Liberal Democrat gains
 from Labour
 Birmingham Yardley
 Brent East (in a by-election, retained)
 Bristol West
 Cambridge
 Cardiff Central
 Dunbartonshire East
 Falmouth and Camborne
 Hornsey and Wood Green
 Inverness, Nairn, Badenoch and Strathspey
 Leeds North West
 Manchester Withington
 Rochdale

 from the Conservatives
 Solihull
 Taunton
 Westmorland and Lonsdale

 from Plaid Cymru
 Ceredigion

Scottish National Party (SNP) gains
 from Labour
 Dundee East
 Na h-Eileanan an Iar

Democratic Unionist Party (DUP) gains
 from the Ulster Unionists
 East Antrim
 Lagan Valley
 South Antrim
 Upper Bann

Social Democrat and Labour Party (SDLP) gain
 from the Ulster Unionists
 Belfast South

Sinn Féin gain
 from the SDLP
 Newry and Armagh

Respect gain
 from Labour
 Bethnal Green and Bow

Independent candidate gain
 from Labour
 Blaenau Gwent

Ø Indicates Scottish seat. Due to boundary changes, these are notional gains/losses.

2005 United Kingdom general election
Results of United Kingdom general elections by parliamentary constituency